Alburnoides namaki, is a fish species of the family Cyprinidae, known from Iran. It can be differentiated from its cogenerates by differences in fin ray and vertebral counts, together with other morphological characters.

References

Further reading
Turan, Davut, et al. "Alburnoides manyasensis (Actinopterygii, Cyprinidae), a new species of cyprinid fish from Manyas Lake basin, Turkey." ZooKeys 276 (2013): 85.
Hoghoghi, Melahat, Soheil Eagderi, and Bahmen Shams-Esfandabad. "Habitat use of Alburnoides namaki, in the Jajroud River (Namak Lake basin, Iran)." International Journal of Aquatic Biology 3.6 (2016): 390–397.

Alburnoides
Taxa named by Nina Gidalevna Bogutskaya
Taxa named by Brian W. Coad
Fish described in 2009
Fish of Iran